Events in the year 1883 in Iceland.

Incumbents 

 Monarch: Christian IX
 Minister for Iceland: Johannes Nellemann

Events 

 Hofskirkja is constructed in Hof in South Iceland.
 Grímsvötn erupts.

Births 

 24 August – Thorbergur Thorvaldson, chemist.
 15 April – Gordon Sigurjonsson, athlete.

References 

 
1880s in Iceland
Years of the 19th century in Iceland
Iceland
Iceland